Andrei Alba (born 14 January 1995) is a Brazilian professional footballer who plays as a defensive midfielder for Sociedade Esportiva do Gama.

Club career
Born in Engenho Velho, Rio Grande do Sul, Alba was a Chapecoense youth graduate. On 25 January 2016, shortly after being promoted to the first team, he signed a new contract with the club running until 2018.

Alba made his senior debut on 14 February 2016, coming on as a second-half substitute for Josimar in a 2–0 Campeonato Catarinense away win against Brusque. His Série A debut came on 4 June, as he replaced injured Moisés Ribeiro in a 0–0 home draw against Fluminense.

On 21 July 2016, Alba was loaned to Concórdia until the end of the year. Returning to Chape in January 2017 after contributing with 16 matches, he suffered a serious knee injury, being sidelined for several months.

Career statistics

References

External links

AV Assessoria profile 

Living people
1995 births
Brazilian footballers
Sportspeople from Rio Grande do Sul
Association football midfielders
Campeonato Brasileiro Série A players
Campeonato Brasileiro Série D players
Grêmio Foot-Ball Porto Alegrense players
Cerâmica Atlético Clube players
Associação Chapecoense de Futebol players
Concórdia Atlético Clube players
Operário Futebol Clube (MS) players
Clube Náutico Marcílio Dias players
Sobradinho Esporte Clube players
Sociedade Esportiva do Gama players